Tyrone Zephania Sterling (born 8 October 1987) is a Grenadian professional footballer who plays as a defender for the English club Dover Athletic.

Club career
On 24 May 2019, Sterling joined Hemel Hempstead Town.

In June 2022, Sterling returned to Dover Athletic with the club having recently been relegated to the National League South, their first season in the division since Sterling was part of the squad that had earned promotion eight years previously.

International career
Sterling made his debut for the Grenada national football team in a 2–0 CONCACAF Nations League loss to Cuba national football team on 12 October 2018. He also represented England's 6-a-side team at the 2019 Socca World Cup.

Honours
Bromley
FA Trophy runner-up: 2017–18

Concord Rangers
FA Trophy runner-up: 2019–20

References

External links
 
 

1987 births
Living people
Footballers from Bromley
People with acquired Grenadian citizenship
Grenadian footballers
Grenada international footballers
English footballers
English sportspeople of Grenadian descent
Association football fullbacks
Concord Rangers F.C. players
Bromley F.C. players
Dartford F.C. players
Dover Athletic F.C. players
Cray Wanderers F.C. players
Dulwich Hamlet F.C. players
Hemel Hempstead Town F.C. players
Isthmian League players
National League (English football) players
2021 CONCACAF Gold Cup players